Adrienne Monique Coleman (Born November 13, 1980) is an American actress known for her role in the High School Musical movies, in which she plays Taylor McKessie.

Early life and education
Adrienne Monique Coleman was born in Orangeburg, South Carolina. She started her acting career in theater and television at a very young age in Columbia, South Carolina. She currently lives in Los Angeles. Her training began at the Workshop Theater School of Dramatic Arts where she performed in over 15 plays. 

Coleman went to Heathwood Hall Episcopal School. Afterward attending The Theater School at DePaul University in Chicago, earning her BFA in Acting in 2002.

Career
Coleman made her first lead in the independent feature entitled Mother of the River, which was shot in historic Charleston, South Carolina. The film won numerous awards at film festivals in Chicago. Two years later, Coleman appeared as Young Donna in The Family Channel Movie The Ditch digger's Daughters for which she was nominated for a Young Artists Award of Hollywood. During her sophomore year of high school, Coleman wrote, directed, produced, and starred in her own one-person play entitled "Voices from Within" with standing room only – audience numbering in the hundreds. On stage in Chicago, Coleman starred in productions of Noises Off, Polaroid Stories, The Real Thing, and The Colored Museum.

In 2005, Coleman got the chance to work opposite one of her heroes – the legendary James Earl Jones when she played Leesha in the 2005 Hallmark TV Movie The Reading Room. She received a 2006 Camie Award for the role and represented the film at the NAACP Image Awards.

In 2006, Coleman rose to prominence in High School Musical, where she portrayed Taylor McKessie, the best friend of the new girl, Gabriella Montez (Vanessa Hudgens). Before then, she was a recurring guest star in The Suite Life of Zack & Cody episodes, "Forever Plaid", "Not So Suite 16", "Neither a Borrower Nor a Speller Bee" and "A Prom Story" along with Hudgens. Coleman has had seven other guest appearances on television, including Boston Public, Gilmore Girls, Malcolm in the Middle, Strong Medicine, 10-8: Officers on Duty, Married to the Kellys, and Veronica Mars. Coleman was also in the first ever Disney Channel Games in 2006, on the Blue Team (with Brenda Song, Corbin Bleu, Cole Sprouse, Vanessa Hudgens, and Jason Earles and Brandon Baker). She won with both teams. 

She showcased her ballroom skills in "Dance With Me", while she partnered with National Youth Latin Champion Jared Murillo. Drew Seeley was the soloist. She is the host of 3 Minute Game Show: High School Musical Edition on Disney Channel. She recorded a song called "Christmas Vacation" for the holiday album entitled A Disney Channel Holiday. In 2007, she appeared in High School Musical 2. In 2008, she again repeated her role as Taylor McKessie in High School Musical 3.

Dancing with the Stars
Coleman competed in the Fall 2006 third edition of ABC's Dancing with the Stars reality dance competition. She was paired with professional partner Louis van Amstel throughout the competition. Van Amstel and the judges praised her for "taking risks" during the competition. The pair appeared on The Ellen DeGeneres Show before they were eliminated and performed the same dance they performed in week 2's episode. She was eliminated from Dancing With The Stars on November 1, 2006, finishing fourth in the competition. She was the last female in the contest that year. Coleman was very gracious in defeat and appeared on the Jimmy Kimmel Live! show on the same night as the Results Show to thank her fans for their votes and support.

UN Youth Champion

At a ceremony at UN headquarters in New York, she was presented with a letter of recognition of her new role by Assistant Secretary-General Jomo Kwame Sundaram of the Department of Economic and Social Affairs. In presenting the letter, Mr. Sundaram said Coleman will work "to raise awareness about the challenges young people face and will highlight the positive contribution they make to their communities." Coleman said receiving the designation of Youth Champion was "beyond an honor" and she would use her new position to promote global efforts to achieve the anti-poverty Millennium Development Goals (MDGs).

Philanthropy
Coleman worked with dosomething.org to produce a "Do Something U" video tutorial. The video targets young activists who need a bit of guidance and inspiration to help them carry out their ideas for their communities to fruition. Coleman's video tutorial focused on teaching youth the best way to utilize social media to spread word of ideas and actions.

Personal life
Coleman was married to Walter Jordan in February 2012. They divorced in February 2022.

Filmography

Film

Television

Music 

 High School Musical, Start of Something New (Concert) Featuring Corbin Bleu, Monique Coleman, Lucas Grabeel, Ashley Tisdale, Vanessa Hudgens & Drew Seeley (2006)
Disney Channel Holiday's Christmas Vacation (2007)
 Pop It Rock It 2: It's On, What Time Is It (2007)

Awards
19th Annual Young Artist Awards (1996–1997)
Best Performance in a TV MOVIE or FEATURE FILM: Young Ensemble – "Ditchdigger's Daughter"
Best Family TV MOVIE/ PILOT/MINI-SERIES (CABLE) – The Ditchdigger's Daughters, Family Channel
Character and Morality in Entertainment Awards (CAMIE) 2006 – The Reading Room
Teen Choice Awards 2006 Award for Choice TV Show: Comedy/Musical – High School Musical
American Music Award 2007 for High School Musical 2
Teen Choice Awards 2009 Award for Choice Movie: Music/Dance – High School Musial 
Daytime Emmy Awards 2019 : Outstanding Host ( Nominated)

References

External links

Monique Coleman's Official Site

1980 births
Living people
People from Orangeburg, South Carolina
African-American actresses
American television actresses
DePaul University alumni
Participants in American reality television series
Actresses from South Carolina
20th-century American actresses
21st-century American actresses
20th-century African-American women
20th-century African-American people
21st-century African-American women
21st-century African-American people